Chester Higgins Jr. (born November 1946) is an American photographer, who was a staff photographer with The New York Times for more than four decades, and whose work has notably featured the life and culture of people of African descent. His  photographs have over the years appeared in magazines including Look, Life, Time, Newsweek, Fortune, Ebony, Essence and Black Enterprise, and Higgins has also published several collections of his photography, among them Black Woman (1970), Feeling the Spirit: Searching the World for the People of Africa (1994), Elder Grace: The Nobility of Aging (2000), and Echo of the Spirit: A Photographer’s Journey (2004).

Life and work
Higgins was born in Fairhope, Alabama, and grew up in New Brockton, Alabama. He attended Tuskegee Institute (now Tuskegee University), where he was mentored by the school's official photographer, P. H. Polk, and graduated in 1970 with a bachelor's degree in business management. Higgins worked as a photographer for The New York Times from 1975 and exhibited in museums throughout the world.

Historian Lonnie Bunch has said of Higgins: "He elevated photography from documentary to fine art." Work by Higgins is included in the permanent collection of the Museum of Modern Art and has been included in numerous book collections and appeared in publications such as Newsweek, Fortune, Look, Essence and Life. 

Higgins has traveled to the African continent some 50 times since first going to Senegal in 1971, and according to Lonnie Bunch: "He's capturing an Africa that has a spirit of hope, of possibility that in some ways he believes will shape the African-American experience as well."

In Sacred Nile, Higgins narrates the story of the African beginnings of spirituality, antecedents of the Biblical world along the River Nile from the 6,000-foot-high mountains of Kush (modern-day Ethiopia) through Nubia (Sudan) down to the ancient land of Kemet (Egypt).

Higgins is represented by Bruce Silverstein Gallery in New York City.

In 2022, Higgins was inducted into the International Photography Hall of Fame and Museum.

Published books

 With Machobane, Burns, Student Unrest at Tuskegee Institute: A Chronology, Behavioral Science Research Institute, Tuskegee University, Alabama, 1968. An academic community in conflict and its resolution.
 With McDougall, Harold, Black Woman, New York: McCalls Publishing, 1970. A portrait of the universality of women and the uniqueness of being black during the 1960s.
 With Coombs, Orde, Drums of Life, New York: Doubleday/Anchor Press, 1974. A portrait of the universality of men and the uniqueness of being black in the 1970s.
 With Coombs, Orde, Some Time Ago, New York: Doubleday/Anchor Press, 1980. A historical portrait of blacks in the United States between 1850 and 1950.
 Feeling The Spirit: Searching the World for the People of Africa, New York: Bantam Books, 1994. A portrait of the African Diaspora.
 With Betsy Kissam. Elder Grace: The Nobility of Aging, Boston: Bulfinch Press, November 2000. 
 With Betsy Kissam. Echo of the Spirit: A Photographer’s Journey, New York: Doubleday, October 2004.  
 With Fisher, Marjorie M; Peter Lacovara; Salima Ikram; Sue H. D'Auria. Ancient Nubia: African Kingdoms on the Nile. American University Press Cairo, October 2012.

References

External links

 
 "Chester Higgins 'Show Me Your Soul' by Robert Glasper". YouTube video.
 Jordan Coley, "Chester Higgins’s Life in Pictures", The New Yorker, August 27, 2021.

1946 births
20th-century African-American artists
20th-century American photographers
21st-century African-American people
African-American photographers
American portrait photographers
Living people